Tod Howarth (born September 24, 1957) is an American rock musician from San Diego, California. He is best known as serving as a keyboardist, a guitarist, and vocalist for the melodic hard rock group Frehley's Comet, led by former Kiss guitarist Ace Frehley. The band recorded three albums and produced four music videos before the line-up ultimately dissolved, with Frehley moving back to solo efforts.

Howarth's music career began in the early 1980s with the group 707. He has also performed with Cheap Trick and Ted Nugent and released four solo albums, the first in 1995.  He also provided background vocals for Nugent's Penetrator album in 1984, and Loudness' album Hurricane Eyes in 1987.

Howarth joined Cheap Trick again in 2008; at the 30th anniversary 2008 Budokan show, he was seen on stage playing the keyboard and supplying backing vocals. He was originally scheduled to participate in the 2008 Journey / Heart / Cheap Trick tour, but budget restrictions caused him to be unable to participate.

On December 14, 2008 Howarth released an acoustic version of the Frehley's Comet classic "Time Ain't Runnin' Out" exclusively on his MySpace page.

Howarth's latest solo album, Opposite Gods was released independently in April 2010. In June 2012, he released a video single on YouTube of his single *"Cold Beach", filmed on location in the California desert. The video was shot and edited primarily by Vancouver producer Brian Sword.

In June, 2016, Howarth, along with ex-Frehley's Comet bassist, John Regan, ex-Skid Row drummer, Rob Affuso, and guitarist Pat Gasperini, released an album under the band name Four By Fate.  Entitled Relentless, the album was released by The End Records.

Howarth also performs at charity events, such as Stand Down for veterans and their families.

Solo discography
Silhouette (1995)
Cobalt Parlor (1997)
West of Eight (2000)
Winter (2002)
Opposite Gods (2010)

Ace Frehley discography
Frehley's Comet (July 7, 1987)
Live+1 (February 1988)
Second Sighting (May 24, 1988)
12 Picks (April 8, 1997)
Loaded Deck (January 20, 1998)
Greatest Hits Live (January 24, 2006)

Four By Fate discography 
 Relentless (June 3, 2016)

707 discography
Mega Force (1982)
The Bridge (2004)
Greatest Hits Live (2005)

Filmography
Frehley's Comet Live+4 (1988) (VHS)

References

External links
Official website
Tod Howarth MySpace Page
2017 Interview - Australian Rock Show Podcast

American rock musicians
Musicians from San Diego
1957 births
Living people
Frehley's Comet members